Sosnovka is a rural locality (a village) in Zilairsky Selsoviet, Baymaksky District, Bashkortostan, Russia. The population was 407 as of 2010. There are 7 streets.

Geography 
Sosnovka is located 61 km southeast of Baymak (the district's administrative centre) by road. Baishevo is the nearest rural locality.

References 

Rural localities in Baymaksky District